Chalcophaps is a genus of small doves, commonly called emerald doves, that are found in Indomalaya and Australasia.

Taxonomy 
The genus Chalcophaps was introduced by the English ornithologist John Gould in 1843. The genus name combines the Ancient Greek khalkos meaning "bronze" and phaps meaning "pigeon". The type species is the common emerald dove (Chalcophaps indica).

The genus contains three species:

Members of this genus are small and short-tailed.

References

 
Bird genera